The Deadly Duo is a 1971 Hong Kong Wuxia film directed by Chang Cheh, and starring David Chiang and Ti Lung.

There is another film of similar genre titled Deadly Duo (a.k.a. The Blade of Fury) acted by Chen Shing and Mao Ying, directed by Yeung Ching Chen.

Background 
The film is one of a group of historical near-epics from 1970-73 that were directed by Chang Cheh and starred by Ti Lung and David Chiang, which included The Heroic Ones, New One-Armed Swordsman and Blood Brothers. The Deadly Duo is considerably shorter than the others, and arguably with less emphasis in the way of characterization and plotting and more in the way of fighting, action and adventure.

All the fights involve various weapons, mostly spears and swords, but also some exotic devices such as a pair of lethal cymbals and a container that shoots out incendiary balls. The co-director of the action scenes is Lau Kar-leung (a.k.a. Liu Chia Liang), who had a special interest in spear and stick fighting and went on to direct some of the most renowned Kung Fu films of the late 1970s and early 1980s.

Cast 
David Chiang as Little Bat
Ti Lung as Bao Ting Tien
Ku Feng as Man Tien Kuei
Wong Chung as Hero Gau Shun
Chan Sing as Jin emperor
Stanley Fung as Yian Luyan
Bruce Tong as Hero Yung Yi
Wang Kuang-yu as Hero Yung Fu
Cheng Lui as Hero Shiu
Jin Bong-jin as Hero Chang
Lau Gong as Hero Ma
Yeung Chak-lam as Fire Demon Lui
Bolo Yeung as River Dragon
Wong Pau-gei as Leopard
Lau Kar-wing as Mole
Chan Chuen as Yin Tian Si
Yau Lung as Prince Kang
Woo Wai as Wang San
Gam Kei-chu as Hero Tseng
Lau Dan as Hero Ting Siu
Ho Hon-chau as Hero on raft
Danny Lee as Hero on raft
Jimmy Lung as Hero on raft
Phillip Ko as Hero on raft
Max Lee
Sham Chin-bo
Tung Choi-bo as Emperor's officer / thug at bridge
Lee Hang
Ko Hung as thug at bridge
Wu Chi-chin as Hero
Pao Chia-wen as Hero
Lo Wai as Hero
Lei Lung as Hero
Leung Seung-wan as Hero
Lee Chiu as River Dragon's thug
Huang Ha as River Dragon's thug
To Wing-leung as customer in Yian's shop
San Kuai as executioner / thug at bridge
San Sin as executioner
Lau Jun-fai as executioner
Wong Mei as Yian Luyan's thug
Ho Pak-kwong as Jin soldier
Wong Ching as Man's blade carrier
Hsu Hsia as Man's knight
Yuen Shun-yi
Danny Chow
Cheng Kang-yeh
Tang Tak-cheung
Fung Hak-on
Yen Shi-kwan
Yuen Woo-ping
Dang Bing-chiu
Law Keung

Chui Fat
Ling Hon
Chan Dik-hak
Yuen Cheung-yan
Chik Ngai-hung
Kong Chuen
Ng Yuen-fan
Lai Yan
Chan Keung
Chan Siu-gai
Goo Chim-hung
Wu Por

External links 
 
 
 
 The Deadly Duo on Hong Kong Cinemagic

1971 films
1971 martial arts films
Shaw Brothers Studio films
Wuxia films
Films directed by Chang Cheh
1971 action films
Films set in 12th-century Song dynasty
Hong Kong martial arts films
1970s Hong Kong films